James Michael Arscott (born 15 July 2000 in New Zealand) is a New Zealand rugby union player who plays for the  in Super Rugby. His playing position is scrum-half. He was announced in the Highlanders squad as an injury replacement in April 2021 for the 2021 Super Rugby Aotearoa season. He also represented  in the 2020 Mitre 10 Cup.

Reference list

External links
itsrugby.co.uk profile

2000 births
New Zealand rugby union players
Living people
Rugby union scrum-halves
Otago rugby union players
Highlanders (rugby union) players